The mir-6 microRNA precursor is a precursor microRNA  specific to Drosophila species. In Drosophila melanogaster there are three mir-6 paralogs called dme-mir-6-1, dme-mir-6-2, dme-mir-6-3, which are clustered together in the genome. The extents of these hairpin precursors are estimated based on hairpin prediction. Each precursor is generated following the cleavage of a longer primary transcript in the nucleus, and is exported in the cytoplasm. In the cytoplasm, precursors are further processed by the enzyme Dicer, generating ~22 nucleotide products from each arm of the hairpin. The products generated from the 3' arm of each mir-6 precursor have identical sequences. Both 5' and 3' mature products are experimentally validated. Experimental data suggests that the mature products of mir-6 hairpins are expressed in the early embryo of Drosophila and target apoptotic genes such as hid, grim and rpr.

Links to further miRNAs
Near perfect complementarity has been observed between miR-5 and miR-6 at 20/21 nucleotides. However, miR-5 is only related on a minor level to any of the three respective miR-6 sequences. miR-6 genes reside in a gene cluster containing other non-K-box family miRNAs, including miRNAs-3 and-309, and the Brd box family gene mir-4. Alignment has shown miR-6 to share the same family motif as miR-11 and miR-2b, together making up the mir-2 clan. There is, however, little similarity in the 3' ends between these clan members.

Apoptotic regulation
mir-6 plays a key role in the regulation of early apoptosis. Indeed, there is a much increased apoptotic rate in miR-6-depleted embryos compared with control embryos, indicating that mir-6 acts to suppress apoptosis. The pro-apoptotic factor Hid is controlled solely by miR-6, which sees its regulation at a post-transcriptional level. miR-6-depleted embryos have been found to show the strongest phenotype of all miR-2 family members, explained by their interaction with hid, the pro-apoptotic gene with the broadest expression and strongest proapoptotic effect. Embryos injected with mir-6 antisense failed to differentiate normal internal and external structures, with the number of apoptotic cells much increased compared to wildtype cells. Further work into this with miR-6-depleted blastoderm embryos found pole cell formation at the posterior end of the anteroposterior axis to be disrupted, despite normality of both cellularisation and early pattern formation.

References

External links 
 
 miRBase entry for mir-6 related microRNAs

MicroRNA
MicroRNA precursor families